Chuck-a-luck, also known as birdcage, is a game of chance played with three dice. It is derived from grand hazard and both can be considered a variant of sic bo, which is a popular casino game, although chuck-a-luck is more of a carnival game than a true casino game. The game is sometimes used as a fundraiser for charity.

Rules
Chuck-a-luck is played with three standard dice that are kept in a device shaped somewhat like an hourglass which resembles a wire-frame bird cage and pivots about its centre. The dealer rotates the cage end over end, with the dice landing on the bottom.

Wagers are placed based on possible combinations that can appear on the three dice.  The possible wagers are usually fewer than the wagers that are possible in sic bo and, in that sense, chuck-a-luck can be considered to be a simpler game. In the simplest variant, betters place stakes on a board labelled 1–6. They receive a 1:1 payout if the number bet on appears once, a 2:1 payout if the number appears twice, and a 3:1 payout if the number is rolled all 3 times. In this respect, the basic game resembles Crown and anchor, but with numbered dice instead of symbols.

Additional wagers that are commonly seen, and their associated odds, are set out in the table below.

House advantage or edge
Chuck-a-luck is a game of chance. On average, the players are expected to lose more than they win.  The casino's advantage (house advantage or house edge) is greater than most other casino games and can be much greater.

For example, there are 216 (6 × 6 × 6) possible outcomes for a single throw of three dice. For a specific number:

 there are 75 possible outcomes, where only one die will match the number;
 there are 15 possible outcomes, where only two dice will match; and
 there is one possible outcome, where all three dice will match; and
 there are 125 possible outcomes, where no die will match the number.

At odds of 1 to 1, 2 to 1 and 10 to 1 respectively for each of these types of outcome, the expected loss as a percentage of the stake wagered is:

1 - ((75/216) × 2 + (15/216) × 3 + (1/216) × 11) = 4.6%

At worse odds of 1 to 1, 2 to 1 and 3 to 1, the expected loss as a percentage of the stake wagered is:

1 - ((75/216) × 2 + (15/216) × 3 + (1/216) × 4) = 7.9%

If the odds are adjusted to 1 to 1, 3 to 1 and 5 to 1 respectively, the expected loss as a percentage is:

1 - ((75/216) × 2 + (15/216) × 4 + (1/216) × 6) = 0%

Commercially organised gambling games almost always have a house advantage which acts as a fee for the privilege of being allowed to play the game, so the last scenario would represent a payout system used for a home game, where players take turns being the role of banker/casino.

Variants

 Chuck-a-luck is essentially identical to the traditional Vietnamese game Bau cua ca cop.
 A version of the Big Six wheel is loosely based on chuck-a-luck, with various combinations of three dice appearing in 54 slots on a spinning wheel. Because of the distribution of the combinations, the house advantage or edge for this wheel is greater than for chuck-a-luck.

In popular culture
There is a reference to chuck-a-luck in the Abbott and Costello film Hold That Ghost.

In Fritz Lang's 1952 film, Rancho Notorious, chuck-a-luck is the name of the ranch run by Altar Keane (played by Marlene Dietrich) where outlaws hide from the law. Chuck-a-luck is featured in the lyrics to the theme song and in some plot points.

The game is played by Lazar in the James Bond movie The Man with the Golden Gun.

The game is played by Freddie Rumsen in Mad Men Season 2 Episode 9: Six-Month Leave.

In Dragonfly in Amber the character Claire Randall describes the activity inside of an inn as having several soldiers playing chuck-a-luck on the floor along with a dog sleeping by the fire and smelling strongly of hops.

See also
Crown and anchor

References

Dice games